Eupithecia glaisi is a moth in the family Geometridae. It is found in Algeria.

References

Moths described in 1937
glaisi
Moths of Africa